The Southern Intercollegiate Athletic Conference men's basketball tournament is the annual conference men's basketball championship tournament for the Southern Intercollegiate Athletic Conference. The tournament has been held annually since 1934. It is a single-elimination tournament and seeding is based on regular season records.

The winner receives the SIAC's automatic bid to the NCAA Division II men's basketball tournament.

Florida A&M have been the most successful team at the CIAA tournament, with twelve championships.

History

Championship records

 Allen, Central State (OH), Edward Waters, and Spring Hill have not yet won the SIAC tournament
 Rust and Talladega never won the tournament as SIAC members
 Schools highlighted in pink are former members of the SIAC

See also
 SIAC women's basketball tournament

References

NCAA Division II men's basketball conference tournaments
Basketball Tournament, Men's
Recurring sporting events established in 1934